The Pakhtunkhwa Highway Authority constructs and maintains the provincial highways in the Khyber Pakhtunkhwa province of Pakistan. It was previously known as Frontier Highways Authority and was established on August 29, 2001.

See also
Provincial Highways of Khyber Pakhtunkhwa
National Highways of Pakistan
Motorways of Pakistan
Transport in Pakistan

References

External links 
 Pakhtunkhwa Highways Authority

Roads in Khyber Pakhtunkhwa
Road authorities
Pakistani road authorities